Vlachs of Serbia are a Romanian-speaking group in eastern Serbia

Vlachs of Serbia may also refer to:
 Romanians in Serbia, an ethnic Romanian group mainly living in the Banat region
 Vlachs in medieval Serbia, ethnic groups referred to as "Vlachs" throughout the Middle Ages in Serbia
 Aromanians in Serbia, sometimes referred to in Serbia as "Vlachs" but more usually as "Tsintsars"
 Megleno-Romanians in Serbia, another ethnic group sometimes known as "Vlachs"